Winston Park may refer to:

Winston Park, KwaZulu-Natal, a residential area in South Africa
Winston Park, New Jersey, United States, an unincorporated community
Winston Parks, a footballer from Costa Rica